Gildevanio Ilso dos Santos Diniz (August 29, 1986), better known as Gil Diniz or Carteiro Reaça, is a Brazilian postman and politician. He has been a member of the Social Liberal Party since 2018, until he was expelled in 2020 for allegedly spreading fake news and attacks on democratic institutions, such as the STF.

Biography

He was born in Serra Talhada, in the interior of Pernambuco in 1986. 
Diniz started the History course with a full scholarship through the state program Prouni, but did not complete it. Between 2009 and 2011, he tried to join the Military Police of São Paulo State, but failed to pass the psychotechnical exam.

Diniz joined the Brazilian Post and Telegraph Company, where he became known in his unit for being critical of the company's union and the Workers' Party. There he received the nickname "Carteiro (Postman) Reaça".

During the 2014 elections, he met Eduardo Bolsonaro of whom he became a friend and started helping with the leaflets of Eduardo's campaign for deputy. After Eduardo's election, Gil became Eduardo's office advisor, a position he held until August 2018, with an average salary of 5,000 reais a month.

In the 2018 elections, he was elected state representative by São Paulo, with an expressive vote of 214,037 votes.

Personal life

Diniz has two children. He is Roman Catholic.

Controversy

According to the survey of Aos Fatos in May 2020, Gil Diniz and a group of seven deputies investigated in the fake news survey published an average of two posts per day on a social network over a period of three months, with misinformation or mentioning the STF critical.

Electoral performance

References

External links
 Gil Diniz on Facebook
 Gil Diniz on Instagram
 Gil Diniz on Twitter

1986 births
Living people
Brazilian Roman Catholics
Members of the Legislative Assembly of São Paulo
Social Liberal Party (Brazil) politicians
Social Christian Party (Brazil) politicians
Conservatism in Brazil